In algebraic geometry, a moduli space of (algebraic) curves  is a geometric space (typically a scheme or an algebraic stack) whose points represent isomorphism classes of algebraic curves.  It is thus a special case of a moduli space. Depending on the restrictions applied to the classes of algebraic curves considered, the corresponding moduli problem and the moduli space is different. One also distinguishes between  fine and coarse moduli spaces for the same moduli problem.

The most basic problem is that of moduli of smooth complete curves of a fixed genus. Over the field of complex numbers these correspond precisely to compact Riemann surfaces of the given genus, for which Bernhard Riemann proved the first results about moduli spaces, in particular their dimensions ("number of parameters on which the complex structure depends").

Moduli stacks of stable curves
The moduli stack  classifies families of smooth projective curves, together with their isomorphisms.   When , this stack may be compactified by adding new "boundary" points which correspond to stable nodal curves (together with their isomorphisms).  A curve is stable if it is complete, connected, has no singularities other than double points, and has only a finite group of automorphisms.  The resulting stack is denoted .  Both moduli stacks carry universal families of curves.

Both stacks above have dimension ; hence a stable nodal curve can be completely specified by choosing the values of  parameters, when . In lower genus, one must account for the presence of smooth families of automorphisms, by subtracting their number. There is exactly one complex curve of genus zero, the Riemann sphere, and its group of isomorphisms is PGL(2).

Likewise, in genus 1, there is a one-dimensional space of curves, but every such curve has a one-dimensional group of automorphisms.  Hence, the stack  has dimension 0.

Construction and irreducibility 
It is a non-trivial theorem, proved by Pierre Deligne and David Mumford, that the moduli stack  is irreducible, meaning it cannot be expressed as the union of two proper substacks. They prove this by analyzing the locus  of stable curves in the Hilbert scheme  of tri-canonically embedded curves (from the embedding of the very ample  for every curve) which have Hilbert polynomial . Then, the stack  is a construction of the moduli space . Using deformation theory, Deligne and Mumford show this stack is smooth and use the stack of isomorphisms between stable curves , to show that  has finite stabilizers, hence it is a Deligne–Mumford stack.

,

Also, any component of  must contain non-singular curves. Furthermore, because every component intersects , all components must be contained in a single component, hence the coarse space  is irreducible. From the general theory of algebraic stacks, this implies the stack quotient  is irreducible.

Properness 
Properness, or compactness for orbifolds, follows from a theorem on stable reduction on curves. This can be found using a theorem of Grothendieck regarding the stable reduction of Abelian varieties, and showing its equivalence to the stable reduction of curves.section 5.2

Coarse moduli spaces
One can also consider the coarse moduli spaces representing isomorphism classes of smooth or stable curves.  These coarse moduli spaces were actually studied before the notion of moduli stack was introduced.  In fact, the idea of a moduli stack  was introduced by Deligne and Mumford  in an attempt to prove the projectivity of the coarse moduli spaces.  In recent years, it has become apparent that the stack of curves is actually the more fundamental object.

The coarse moduli spaces have the same dimension as the stacks when ; however, in genus zero the coarse moduli space has dimension zero, and in genus one, it has dimension one.

Examples of low genus moduli spaces

Genus 0 
Determining the geometry of the moduli space of genus  curves can be established using deformation Theory. The number of moduli for a genus  curve, e.g. , is given by the cohomology groupWith Serre duality this cohomology group is isomorphic tofor the dualizing sheaf .

Genus 1 

The genus 1 case is one of the first well-understood cases of moduli spaces, at least over the complex numbers, because isomorphism classes of elliptic curves are classified by the J-invariantwhere . Topologically,  is just the affine line, but it can be compactified to a stack with underlying topological space  by adding a stable curve at infinity. This is an elliptic curve with a single cusp.

Note that most authors consider the case of genus one curves with one marked point as the origin of the group since otherwise the stabilizer group in a hypothetical moduli space  would have stabilizer group at the point  given by the curve, since elliptic curves have an Abelian group structure. This adds unneeded technical complexity to this hypothetical moduli space. On the other hand,  is a smooth Deligne–Mumford stack.

Genus 2

Affine parameter space 
In genus 2 it is a classical result that all such curves are hyperelliptic,pg 298 so the moduli space can be determined completely from the branch locus of the curve using the Riemann–Hurwitz formula. Since an arbitrary genus 2 curve is given by a polynomial of the form

for some uniquely defined , the parameter space for such curves is given by

where  corresponds to the locus .

Weighted projective space 
Using a weighted projective space and the Riemann–Hurwitz formula, a hyperelliptic curve can be described as a polynomial of the form

Then, the locus of sections which contain no triple root contains every curve  represented by a point .

Genus 3 
This is the first moduli space of curves which has both a hyperelliptic locus and a non-hyperelliptic locus. The non-hyperelliptic curves are all given by plane curves of degree 4 (using the genus degree formula), which are parameterized by the smooth locus in the Hilbert scheme of hypersurfaces

.

Then, the moduli space is stratified by the substacks

.

Birational geometry

Unirationality conjecture 
In all of the previous cases, the moduli spaces can be found to be unirational, meaning there exists a dominant rational morphismand it was long expected this would be true in all genera. Although, it turns out that for genus  all such moduli spaces are of general type, meaning they are not unirational. They accomplished this by studying the Kodaira dimension of the coarse moduli spaces

and hence  is of general type.

Geometric implication 
This is significant geometrically because it implies any linear system on a ruled variety cannot contain the universal curve .

Stratification of boundary 
The moduli space  has a natural stratification on the boundary  whose points represent singular genus  curves. It decomposes into strata

,

where

  where the action permutes the two marked points.
  whenever  is even.

The curves lying above these loci correspond to

 A pair of curves  connected at a double point.
 The normalization of a genus  curve at a single double point singularity.
 A pair of curves of the same genus connected at a double point up to permutation.

Stratification for genus 2 
For the genus  case, there is a stratification given by

.

Further analysis of these strata can be used to give the generators of the Chow ring  proposition 9.1.

Moduli of marked curves
One can also enrich the problem by considering the moduli stack of genus g nodal curves with n marked points, pairwise distinct and distinct from the nodes.  Such marked curves are said to be stable if the subgroup of curve automorphisms which fix the marked points is finite.  The resulting moduli stacks of smooth (or stable) genus g curves with n marked points are denoted  (or ), and have dimension .

A case of particular interest is the moduli stack  of genus 1 curves with one marked point.  This is the stack of elliptic curves. Level 1 modular forms are sections of line bundles on this stack, and  level N modular forms are sections of line bundles on the stack of elliptic curves with level N structure (roughly a marking of the points of order N).

Boundary geometry
An important property of the compactified moduli spaces  is that their boundary can be described in terms of moduli spaces  for genera . Given a marked, stable, nodal curve one can associate its dual graph, a graph with vertices labelled by nonnegative integers and allowed to have loops, multiple edges and also numbered half-edges. Here the vertices of the graph correspond to irreducible components of the nodal curve, the labelling of a vertex is the arithmetic genus of the corresponding component, edges correspond to nodes of the curve and the half-edges correspond to the markings. In the product the factor corresponding to a vertex v has genus gv taken from the labelling and number of markings  equal to the number of outgoing edges and half-edges at v. The total genus g is the sum of the gv plus the number of closed cycles in the graph.

Stable curves whose dual graph is a tree are called "compact type" (because the Jacobian is compact) and their moduli space is denoted .

See also
Moduli of marked curves
Witten conjecture
Tautological ring
Grothendieck–Riemann–Roch theorem

References

Classic references

Books on moduli of curves

Cohomology and intersection theory

External links
 "Topology and geometry of the moduli space of curves"
 "Moduli of Stable Maps, Gromov-Witten Invariants, and Quantum Cohomology"

Moduli theory
Algebraic varieties